Anatoli Volovodenko (born 21 July 1963) is a Tajikistani former professional footballer.

Club career
He made his professional debut in the Soviet First League in 1984 for Pamir Dushanbe. He then played for FC Ural and finished his career at FC Nosta Novotroitsk.

References

1963 births
Sportspeople from Dushanbe
Living people
Tajikistani people of Ukrainian descent
Soviet footballers
Tajikistani footballers
Tajikistani expatriate footballers
Tajikistan international footballers
Soviet Top League players
Russian Premier League players
CSKA Pamir Dushanbe players
FC Ural Yekaterinburg players
Association football defenders
FC Nosta Novotroitsk players